Matri may refer to:
Matri (mountain), in the Himalayas
Matri (biblical figure), ancestor of Saul, the first King of Israel
Alessandro Matri (born 19 August 1984), Italian footballer
MATRI could mean monoamine transporter reuptake inhibitor